Benowo  is a village in the administrative district of Gmina Ryjewo, within Kwidzyn County, Pomeranian Voivodeship, in northern Poland.

For the history of the region, see History of Pomerania.

The village has a population of 308.

Notable residents
 Horst Krause (born 1941), actor

References

Benowo